"I Stay Away" is a song from Alice in Chains' 1994 EP Jar of Flies, and the second single from the album. This song marked the first time the band wrote with bassist Mike Inez. The single reached No. 10 on Billboard's Mainstream Rock Tracks, and stayed in the chart for 26 weeks.  "I Stay Away" was nominated for the Grammy Award for Best Hard Rock Performance in 1995. The song was included on the compilation albums Nothing Safe: Best of the Box (1999), Music Bank (1999), Greatest Hits (2001), and The Essential Alice in Chains (2006).

Origin and recording
In the liner notes of 1999's Music Bank box set collection, guitarist Jerry Cantrell said of the song:

Composition
The track is notably softer than Alice in Chains's previous recordings on both Facelift and Dirt; however, despite the bright opening guitar riff and verse, the song's pre-chorus suddenly detours into dark, sludgy electric guitar and a haunting vocal harmony. The chorus then reintroduces the upbeat tones with powerfully long-drawn vocals and anxious violins performed by Matthew Weiss, Co-founder/President/Concertmaster of the Octava Chamber Orchestra in Seattle, WA. A hard rock electric guitar solo then plays amidst the bright acoustic section.

"I Stay Away" also uses a great deal of instrumentation that Alice in Chains had previously not attempted, including string instruments. It also effectively demonstrates the harmony between vocalist Layne Staley and guitarist Jerry Cantrell.

Release and reception
"I Stay Away" made its radio premiere in March 1994. It debuted at No. 39 on the Billboard Mainstream Rock Tracks chart on the week of May 14, 1994, and peaked at No. 10 in the week of July 2, 1994. The song was nominated for the Grammy Award for Best Hard Rock Performance in 1995.

Ned Raggett of AllMusic said, "The seeming schizophrenia between massive rock crunch and gentle acoustic numbers was actually one of Alice in Chains' strongest traits, and on the brilliant "I Stay Away" the two impulses fused to create what on balance was the band's most uplifting song, sonically if not always lyrically."

"I Stay Away" was featured on Guitar World and Guitar Player's "Top 30 12-string guitar songs of all time" list in 2016 at No. 26.

Music video

The music video for "I Stay Away" was released in May 1994 and was directed by Nick Donkin, also known for his animated short film The Junky's Christmas. The video was created entirely using stop-motion animation, and includes the band members in puppet form. The band travels to a circus aboard a bus, along with a sinister looking boy holding a jar full of flies. At the circus, the boy releases the flies that cause chaos to the animals and performers: an angry lion mauls its tamer, a daredevil loses control of his motorcycle during a stunt and crashes, two elephants panic, a trio of clowns crash their car and get in a fight, and a blindfolded knife thrower inadvertently kills his female assistant. Eventually, the circus burns down with the workers looking on in horror. Once the flies return to their jar, we see the boy petting them as a reward for a job well done. The video is available on the home video release Music Bank: The Videos.

The puppets used in the video are on display at the Rock and Roll Hall of Fame museum in Cleveland, Ohio.

Live performances
Despite being one of the band's highest charting singles, "I Stay Away" was never played live with original vocalist and lyricist Layne Staley, and it has only been performed twice since the band's reunion.

On November 2, 2007, Alice In Chains performed the song live for the first time with new vocalist William DuVall and The NorthWest Symphony Orchestra at the Benaroya Hall in Seattle, as part of a benefit concert for the Seattle Children's Hospital.

In popular culture
"I Stay Away" was featured in "Walking Erect" (1994), episode 10, season 3 of Beavis and Butt-Head.

Track listing

Personnel
Layne Staleylead vocals
Jerry Cantrellguitars, vocals
Mike Inezbass guitar
Sean Kinneydrums, percussion
Additional Performers
April Acevezviola
Rebecca Clemons-Smithviolin
Matthew Weissviolin
Justine Foyvioloncello

Chart positions

Certifications

References

External links

I Stay Away on Setlist.fm

1994 songs
1994 singles
1990s ballads
Alice in Chains songs
Rock ballads
Songs written by Layne Staley
Songs written by Jerry Cantrell
Songs written by Mike Inez
Columbia Records singles
Music videos featuring puppetry
Stop-motion animated music videos